Volders is a municipality in the district of Innsbruck-Land in the Austrian state of Tyrol located 12 km east of Innsbruck on the southern side of the Inn River.

Geography
Sights are Schloss Friedberg and Schloss Aschach and the church of Saint Charles Borromeo, attached to a Servite convent.

Next to the church at the entrance of the village lies the Volderer See, a small lake which has shrunk significantly and now resembles a pond. It has no natural inflow or outflow, and receives water primarily from rain, and also the groundwater of the Inn River. The water quality is moderate, varying between grades B and C, and is often plagued by algae. There is a local legend that a giant blocked the inflow to the lake with a large boulder, causing it to shrink.

Population

References

External links

 Municipality of Volders: Official website of the municipality in the Hall-Wattens region

Cities and towns in Innsbruck-Land District